Bruno Marioni Giménez (born 15 June 1975, in Paraná) is a retired Argentine striker who preferred to attack from the sides. He is currently the manager of Liga de Expansión MX team Venados.

Career 
Marioni made his debut under the last name Giménez for Newell's Old Boys in 1995 before moving to Estudiantes in 1997. After 2 seasons in Argentina, Marioni went to Portugal joining Sporting in 1998. In 1999, his father met his paternal grandfather, Luigi Marioni, for the first time. Shortly after, both him and Bruno adopted the elderly man's last name. After a single season in Portugal, he returned to Argentina to play for Independiente. In 2000, he again played in Europe for Villarreal CF, but shortly after he returned to Independiente for the Torneo Clausura 2001. After the tournament, he joined CD Tenerife, but once again returned to Independiente for the Apertura 2003, and then transferred to Pumas UNAM in México. In his opening season there, he was the league's top scorer with 16 goals, along with fellow Argentine Néstor Silvera.

In 2005, Marioni was the Copa Sudamericana's top scorer with 7 goals. He then played for Toluca, and netted an Apertura-leading 11 goals, but in the January transfer window he moved to Boca Juniors. For Apertura 2007 he returns to Mexico for Club Atlas. He played the Interliga 2008 Tournament with Club Atlas and qualified to Copa Libertadores 2008. Marioni then joined Pachuca on 15 June 2008. After playing only for a period of six months with C.F. Pachuca, he returned to Club Atlas citing his family needs before his economic earnings. In June 2009, Marioni agreed to join Estudiantes Tecos. On 12 November 2009, Marioni held a press conference to announce his retirement from professional football.

Honours

Club
UNAM
Primera División de México: Clausura 2004

Boca Juniors
Copa Libertadores: 2007

Individual
Mexican Primera División top scorer (2): Clausura 2004, Apertura 2006
Copa Sudamericana top scorer: 2005
Interliga top scorer: 2008

References

External links
Bruno Marioni at FootballDatabase.com 

Bruno Marioni – Argentine Primera statistics at Fútbol XXI  

1975 births
Living people
Sportspeople from Entre Ríos Province
Argentine people of Italian descent
Argentine footballers
Argentine expatriate footballers
Newell's Old Boys footballers
Argentine Primera División players
Liga MX players
Primeira Liga players
La Liga players
Estudiantes de La Plata footballers
Club Atlético Independiente footballers
Boca Juniors footballers
CD Tenerife players
Villarreal CF players
Club Universidad Nacional footballers
Deportivo Toluca F.C. players
Atlas F.C. footballers
Sporting CP footballers
Tecos F.C. footballers
Expatriate footballers in Mexico
Expatriate footballers in Portugal
Expatriate footballers in Spain
Argentine expatriate sportspeople in Mexico
Argentine expatriate sportspeople in Portugal
Argentine expatriate sportspeople in Spain
Association football forwards